The Naval Amphibious Training Base Fort Pierce, Florida is a former training base centered around Fort Pierce, Florida. The  site extended  from near Vero Beach, Florida to near Jensen Beach, Florida. It included North Hutchinson Island and Hutchinson Island South.

The site was used as a training facility for amphibious troops for invading Normandy during World War II. There were as many as 40,000 troops stationed there. There were 450 buildings.

Training offshore were Underwater Demolition Teams.

In the 21st century, the government has attempted to identify and remove explosives which were buried there at the end of the war, demobilization and closure of the base in 1946.

Footnotes

Amphibious Base Fort Pierce
Military installations in Florida
Military installations closed in the 1940s
Fort Pierce, Florida
Closed installations of the United States Navy